Cneorum pulverulentum is a species of flowering plant in the family Rutaceae, native to the Canary Islands. It was first described by Étienne Ventenat.

References

Cneoroideae
Flora of the Canary Islands